The 2013 BRD Năstase Țiriac Trophy was a men's tennis tournament played on outdoor clay courts and held in Bucharest, Romania, from 21 to 28 April 2013. It was the 21st edition of the BRD Năstase Țiriac Trophy tournament, and was part of the ATP World Tour 250 series of the 2013 ATP World Tour. The total financial commitment by this tournament was €467,800.

It was an anniversary edition of the tournament, celebrating 40 years since Ilie Năstase became the first ever No. 1 player in the ATP rankings.

Singles main draw entrants

Seeds

 1 Rankings are as of April 15, 2013.

Other entrants
The following players received wildcards into the singles main draw:
  Gaël Monfils
  Janko Tipsarević
  Adrian Ungur

The following players received entry from the qualifying draw:
  Matthias Bachinger
  Flavio Cipolla
  Jaroslav Pospíšil
  Serhiy Stakhovsky

The following player received entry as alternate:
  Filippo Volandri

Withdrawals
Before the tournament
  Simone Bolelli (wrist injury)
  Fabio Fognini (fatigue)
  Jürgen Melzer
  Go Soeda

Retirements
  Gaël Monfils (lower back injury)

Doubles main draw entrants

Seeds

 Rankings are as of April 15, 2013.

Other entrants
The following pairs received wildcards into the doubles main draw:
  Marius Copil /  Gaël Monfils
  Victor Hănescu /  Gilles Müller
The following pair received entry as alternates:
  Nicolas Mahut /  Gilles Simon

Withdrawals
Before the tournament
  Fabio Fognini (fatigue)

Finals

Singles

 Lukáš Rosol defeated  Guillermo García-López 6–3, 6–2

Doubles

 Max Mirnyi /  Horia Tecău defeated  Lukáš Dlouhý /  Oliver Marach, 4–6, 6–4, [10–6]

References

External links
Official website

BRD Nastase Tiriac Trophy
Romanian Open
BRD Nastase Tiriac Trophy
April 2013 sports events in Romania